Dylan Tierney-Martin (born 20 June 1999) is an Irish rugby union player, currently playing for Pro14 and European Rugby Champions Cup side Connacht. He plays in the  hooker.

Connacht
Tierney-Martin was named in the Connacht Academy ahead of the 2020–21 season. It is his third year in the academy. He made his Connacht debut in Round 16 of the 2020–21 Pro14 against .

References

External links
itsrugby.co.uk Profile

1999 births
Living people
Irish rugby union players
Connacht Rugby players
Rugby union hookers